Amanda Lee Williams (born 6 September 1988) is a former Australian cricketer. An all-rounder, she bats right-handed and bowls right-arm medium pace. She played 25 List A matches for Western Australia between the 2006–07 and 2014–15 seasons of the Women's National Cricket League (WNCL). She also made 14 appearances for Western Australia in the Australian Women's Twenty20 Cup.

Williams was born in Auckland, New Zealand. She is a sarcoma survivor, having been diagnosed with the disease in 2015.

References

External links
 
 

1988 births
Living people
Australian cricketers
Australian women cricketers
Cricketers from Western Australia
Naturalised citizens of Australia
New Zealand emigrants to Australia
People from Auckland
Sportswomen from Western Australia
Western Australia women cricketers